Sonthofen is the southernmost town of Germany, located in the Oberallgäu region of the Bavarian Alps. Neighbouring Oberstdorf is situated 14 km farther south but is not classified as a town. In 2005, Sonthofen was awarded "Alpenstadt des Jahres" (Alpine city of the year). The town has 21,300 inhabitants (as of 31 December 2015).

Sonthofen is widely known for its milk and cheese products and as a tourist destination.

History
Findings show that the Sonthofen area was already inhabited from the Stone Age to the Roman Empire. In the 6th/7th century, Germanic Alamans settled in the area at the foot of the Kalvarienberg. On the top of the hill, one suspects an old Thing site.

Sonthofen was first mentioned in a document in 1145. It had held the market right with important proprietary rights since 1429.

In 1803, when the Prince-Bishopric of Augsburg was mediatised, Sonthofen came to Bavaria. In 1804 Sonthof Castle becomes the seat of a Bavarian Landgericht (regional court) responsible for justice and administration.

In 1963 the previous market town of Sonthofen is given the town charter. In 1972 Sonthofen becomes the county seat of the newly formed district of Oberallgäu.

In World War II Sonthofen was bombed twice because Adolf Hitler had built the Ordensburg Sonthofen, where young boys were trained for service in Nazi Party organizations. The "Ordensburg" was not destroyed in the war. From 1946 to 1948 it was home to the United States Constabulary school, from May 1951 through February 1952, was used by the United States Air Force in Europe as a basic training center, and from 1956-2009 the German Bundeswehr located its Military Police (Feldjäger) and Staff Service School there. The German Army's NBC Defence School (ABC-Abwehr- und Selbstschutzschule) is located in another barracks in Sonthofen.

Main sights
Green areas
 Ökokurpark (ecological spa park): Next to the Kalvarienberg is the ecological spa park on a steep terrain. It houses a wetland biotope, native plants and information boards on flora and fauna.
 Another park is located in the so-called G'hau an der Iller, where there is also a miniature golf course and a playground.

Buildings
 Burgruine Fluhenstein (castle ruin), 1361 and around 1500/01
 The Catholic church St. Michael is located below the Kalvarienberg. Predecessor buildings probably already existed in the 9th century. 
 The Old School was turned into a town hall by the prince-bishop of Augsburg in 1472. Today it is used as a music school and public library.

Natural monuments
 The Starzlachklamm (a gorge) near the district Winkel, since 1932 accessible for hikers

Museum
 Heimathaus Sonthofen: history and culture of the region

Gallery

Notable people
Eugen Albrecht (1872–1908), pathologist
Philip Bester, Canadian tennis player, born in Sonthofen
Michael Buthe, artist
Michael Endres, pianist
Josef Enzensberger, (1914–1975), Luftwaffe Fighter Ace 1939–1945, born in Sonthofen
Herbert Knaup, actor, born in Sonthofen
Hardy Krüger, actor, spent his childhood in Sonthofen
Winfried G. Sebald, writer, lived in Sonthofen from 1948 to 1963

Awards and associations
With other Alpine towns, Sonthofen engages in the Alpine Town of the Year Association for the implementation of the Alpine Convention to achieve sustainable development in the Alpine Arc. Sonthofen was awarded Alpine Town of the Year 2005.

References

External links

Official Sonthofen website
Postal History of Sonthofen 
History of Sonthofen, in German
Alpine city of the year, Sonthofen, 2005

Ski areas and resorts in Germany
Oberallgäu